The Sadhan College of Engineering and Technology (SCET) is a self-financed technical institution located in  Peerancheru, Himayat Sagar Road, Hyderabad, India. It is 14.3 km from the city center.  It was founded in 1994 by the Sadhan Educational Society formed by Dr. Vizarath Rasool Khan. The college is permitted by the Government of Telangana and approved by AICTE, affiliated to Jawaharlal Nehru Technological University, Hyderabad (JNTUH).

The students are subject to the evaluation process during their four-year program. The Internals constitute the tests and assignments that are conducted every semester. This is the usual academic activity during the semesters. The senior year students complete a research thesis under the guidance of the college faculty.

General
The college has academic departments in engineering and science disciplines.

The entrance to SCET lies on the Mehdipatnam-Suncity Road and is flanked by the Kalimandir. The campus is located 20 km from Shamshabad Airport, 19 km from Secunderabad railway station, 14 km from Nampally railway station, 9 km from Aramghar and 9 km from mehdipatnam.

Departments 
 Civil Engineering
 Computer Science and Engineering
 Electronics and Communication Engineering
 Electrical and Electronics Engineering
 Information Technology
 Mechanical Engineering
 Computer Applications
 Chemistry
 Mathematics
 Physics
 Humanities and Social Sciences

Intake 
The requirement for admission to the undergraduate program is to appear for the Engineering, Agricultural and Medical Common Entrance Test, referred to as EAMCET. This test, which is conducted every year, is competitive with over 300,000 taking the test each year. The candidates are also required to pass the examination of the Board of Intermediate Education, Government of Telangana with Mathematics, Physics and Chemistry as optional subjects, or any other examination recognized by the JNTUH University as equivalent. 600 students are admitted into the undergraduate program every year. A breakdown of the intake is given below.

The intake to the two-year master's degree in Business Administration is based on performance in the Integrated Common Entrance Test (ICET), whereas the admissions for the M TECH programs is through the Graduate Aptitude Test in Engineering (GATE).

EDUCATION 
The college provides undergraduate (Bachelor Of Technology) courses in
 Electrical and Electronics Engineering (EEE)
 Electronics And Communication Engineering (ECE)
 Computer Science Engineering (CSE)
 Mechanical Engineering
 Information Technology (IT)
 Civil Engineering (CE)

It also offers post-graduate (Master of Technology) courses in
 Computer Science Engineering (CSE)
 VLSI (ECE)
 CAD/CAM(Mechanical Engineering)

Management 
 Dr. Mohd Vizarath Rasool Khan (Founder And Chairman).
 Sarib Rasool Khan
 Saqib Rasool Khan
 Azib Rasool Khan
 Shah Alam Rasool Khan (Current Chairman, Shadan Educational Society)
 Shadan Tahniat 
 Syed Azaz-Ur-Rahman 
 Prof. K. M. H. Ansari (Director, Academic & Planning)(Retired)
 Prof. Bollabathini Srinivas (Director)
 Dr. Mohd Ateeq Ur Rahman (Principal)
 M.A. Muneem(Director, Academics)

Heads of department
 Mr. Amer Ali Khan, EEE Department
 Mr. Mohd Ilyas, ECE Department 
 Mr. Gummalla Sridhar, CSE Department
 Dr. Md Ateeq Ur Rahman, IT Department
 Mr. Abdul Qadir, Civil Department
 Dr. Naseeb Khan, Mechanical Department

Co-curricular activities 
Shadan College of Engineering and Technology has an IEEE Student Branch with more than 50 members enrolled. The branch organizes a National Level IEEE Students' Technical Symposium on the eve of the annual meeting of the branch. The event is hosted by the current IEEE SCET Committee and IEEE Student Members with the support of the IEEE Hyderabad section, college management and faculty.

References

External links
 Official website 

Engineering colleges in Hyderabad, India
Educational institutions established in 1994
1994 establishments in Andhra Pradesh